Laelia rubescens is a species of orchid native to Mexico and Central America.

Synonyms
Amalia rubescens (Lindl.) Heynh.
Cattleya rubescens (Lindl.) Beer
Bletia rubescens (Lindl.) Rchb.f.
Laelia acuminata Lindl.
Laelia peduncularis Lindl.
Amalia acuminata (Lindl.) Heynh.
Amalia peduncularis (Lindl.) Heynh.
Laelia pubescens Lem.
Laelia violacea Rchb.f.
Cattleya acuminata (Lindl.) Beer
Cattleya peduncularis (Lindl.) Beer
Bletia peduncularis (Lindl.) Rchb.f.
Bletia violacea (Rchb.f.) Rchb.f.
Bletia acuminata (Lindl.) Rchb.f.
Laelia inconspicua H.G. Jones
Laelia rubescens f. peduncularis (Lindl.) Halb.

rubescens
Flora of Mexico